Catopta is a genus of moths in the family Cossidae.

Species
 Catopta albimacula Staudinger, 1899
 Catopta albonubilus Graeser, 1888
 Catopta albothoracis B.Z. Hua, I. Chou, D. Fang & S. Chen, 1990
 Catopta birmanopta Bryk, 1950
 Catopta cashmirensis (Moore, 1879)
 Catopta danieli (Clench, 1958)
 Catopta dusii Yakovlev, Saldaitis, Kons & Borth, 2013
 Catopta eberti Daniel, 1964
 Catopta griseotincta Daniel, 1940
 Catopta grumi R.V. Yakovlev, 2009
 Catopta hyrcanus (Christoph, 1888)
 Catopta kansuensis Bryk, 1942
 Catopta kendevanensis Daniel, 1937
 Catopta perunovi Yakovlev, 2007
 Catopta rocharva Sheljuzhko, 1943
 Catopta saldaitisi Yakovlev, 2007
 Catopta sikkimensis (Arora, 1965)
 Catopta tropicalis Yakovlev & Witt, 2009

Former species
 Catopta rungsi Daniel & Witt, 1975

References

 , 1937: Zwei neue Cossidae aus Persien. Mitteilungen der Münchner Entomologischen Gesellschaft 27: 49–51. Full article: .
 , 1990: A Phylogenetic study on Cossidae (Lepidoptera: Ditrysia) based on external adult morphology. Zoologische Verhandelingen 263: 1–295. Full article: .
 , 2009: Catoptinae subfam. n., a new subfamily of carpenter-moths (Lepidoptera: Cossidae). Entomological Review 89 (8): 927–932. Original bulletin: Zoologicheskii Zhurnal, 2009, Vol. 88, No. 10, pp. 1207–1212. (in Russian).
 , 2004: Carpenter-Moths (Lepidoptera: Cossidae) of Mongolia. Euroasian Entomological Journal 3 (3): 217–224.
 , 2009: New taxa of African and Asian Cossidae (Lepidoptera). Euroasian Entomological Journal 8 (3): 353–361. Full article: .
 , 2009: The Carpenter Moths (Lepidoptera:Cossidae) of Vietnam. Entomofauna Supplement 16: 11–32.
 , 2013: A brief review of genus Catopta Staudinger, 1899 (Lepidoptera: Cossidae) with description of a new species from China. Zootaxa, 3709(4): 330–340.

External links
Natural History Museum Lepidoptera generic names catalog

Catoptinae
Cossidae genera